The 1874 Hong Kong Typhoon was the third-worst typhoon to ever hit Hong Kong, striking during the night of September 22, 1874 and the morning of September 23, 1874.

Meteorological history
The Colony experienced a period of low pressure, typical of the eye of a typhoon. From 08:00 PM, winds raged and howled with ear-deafening sounds, alongside the painful cries of many people who had become homeless. The typhoon increased in strength steadily up to 02:15 AM on September 23. Modern analysis in 2017 indicated that this great typhoon passed approximately 50 to 60 km to the south of Hong Kong at its closest approach, similar to Hato in 2017. The typhoon began weakening after 03:00 AM.

Impact

China 
In Kwangtung province, at least 10,000 people died in the storm, with some reporting up to 100,000.

Hong Kong

The typhoon hit Hong Kong with "unprecedented violence" and left no less than 2,000 people injured.

Some adventurers went out to the Praya at 11:00 PM and found themselves knee deep in the water and risked being washed away by the waves hitting the shore.  They were forced to retreat by 01:00 AM as the winds were reaching a new high. The East Point on Causeway Bay recorded a water level 4 feet above its average.  Many stores and shops, even far away from the Praya waterfront were flooded and water damaged.

The storm's two-hour impact had injured and killed many in the Colony. Telegraphic communication was interrupted and communication with Hong Kong Island was cut for a time. The town had sustained great loss, its roads were deserted and strewn with debris, house roofs were ruined, windows shattered and walls fallen and cables and gas pipes were blown away and trees uprooted.

Macau
The small Portuguese colony received extreme damage from the typhoon. The damaged steamer Poyang arrived in Hong Kong, reporting that the city was destroyed. Buildings around Praia Grande were destroyed, leaving the coast with sand. The streets and houses in the colony were annihilated. Fortaleza do Monte was damaged, with a torn off roof and collapsed walls. St. Joseph's Seminary and Church was nearly destroyed, with two walls remaining. 300,000 patacas worth of goods were destroyed in the storm, tea and olive oil being the costliest. It was estimated that over 5,000 people have died in Macau, and damages costs around 400,000 patacas. Around 2,000 ships were also sunk during the storm. The damage in the colony were reportedly worse than Paris during Franco-Prussian War, or the recent earthquake in the Philippines. It was considered the worst storm to hit Macau in history.

Aftermath
Most of the 37 ships in port were damaged and hundreds of fishing junks and sampans were either wrecked or broken up despite having sought shelter in the bay. At this time Hong Kong did not have its own weather observatory and many people were expecting the storm from a different direction, while others were caught off guard and either shipwrecked or lost their homes. A few false typhoon alerts had been announced earlier in the year.

The next morning, the Praya scene from west to east was heart-rending: one could easily find boats capsized and corpses floating and drifting on the water with some bodies washed ashore by the high tides.

The sizeable Stonecutters' Island Gaol was left in ruins and both the Police Courts and Victoria Gaol were unroofed.  The damage overall was considered "incalculable".

Ernst Eitel recounted how many of the European and Chinese houses were ruined and became roofless; big trees were unrooted and corpses were found in the ruins and started surfacing at the waterfront from the wrecked ships.

A visitor arriving on a steamer from Peking during the typhoon reported that the waterfront was nearly swept away, hardly a tree was left standing in the Botanical Gardens and many buildings were found roofless and in ruins. People were hastily burying the dead for the heat was intense and there was great concern over the outbreak of contagious diseases.

Following the incident, Brazilian astronomer Francisco Antônio de Almeida, in his 1879 account describes an episode of arson and looting at two warehouses in which foreigners were murdered, for which the two Chinese perpetrators were sentenced to death. Almeida also cites English newspapers of the time who estimated up to eight thousand people killed in the typhoon, many of them being Spanish families fleeing the Carlist Wars, and originally bound for the Philippines.

Controversy
Captain Superintendent of Police Walter Meredith Deane attracted severe criticism for ordering his men confined to barracks rather than to risk rescue of the crews on the wrecked vessels Leonor and Albay.  Refusing calls for a public inquiry, Governor Sir Arthur Kennedy passed all papers on the matter to Secretary of State Lord Carnarvon who affirmed Kennedy's decision.

See also
 Causeway Bay Typhoon Shelter
 Typhoon Hato

References

External links
Pictures
 A review of natural disasters of the past (p54-141).  Courtesy. Hong Kong Museum of History. The typhoon on 22 September 1874. (photos on pp. 65, 67, 84, 86 and 94)
 1874 Typhoon at Hong Kong | Gwulo: Old Hong Kong
 "The impact of the typhoon of September 1874 in Hong Kong. The Basel mission house."

19th century in Hong Kong
1874 Hong Kong
1874 in Hong Kong
Pre-1940 Pacific typhoon seasons
1874 natural disasters
September 1874 events
1874 meteorology